Cunda-Dia-Baze is a town and municipality in Malanje Province in Angola. The municipality had a population of 12,620 in 2014.

References

Populated places in Malanje Province
Municipalities of Angola